Raymond D. Dzendzel (July 29, 1921 – May 1, 2018) was an American politician who was a Democratic member of both houses of the Michigan Legislature between 1955 and 1970.

A native of Ohio, Dzendzel's family moved to Southfield, Michigan in the early 1930s and he graduated from Redford High School and the Detroit Institute of Technology. He enlisted in the United States Coast Guard and served on the USS Peoria during World War II. Dzendzel was business representative with Carpenters Local 982.

In 1954, he sought and won election to the Michigan House of Representatives, serving two terms. He won election to the Michigan Senate in 1958, serving five terms. Dzendzel was Majority Leader in 1965-1966, but became Minority Leader when the Democrats lost control of the Senate in the 1966 election. Endorsed by the AFL–CIO, he lost to then-Representative Jack Faxon, who had been endorsed by the UAW, in the Democratic primary in 1970.

After leaving the Legislature, Dzendzel was a member of the board of Botsford Hospital for 30 years.

Dzendzel died on May 1, 2018 at the age of 96.

References

1921 births
2018 deaths
People from Port Clinton, Ohio
People from Southfield, Michigan
Military personnel from Michigan
Detroit Institute of Technology alumni
Democratic Party members of the Michigan House of Representatives
Democratic Party Michigan state senators
United States Coast Guard personnel of World War II
Redford High School alumni
20th-century American politicians